Thibaut Lesquoy (born 7 July 1995) is a Belgian professional footballer who plays as a defender for Challenger Pro League club Virton.

Club career

Virton
Born in Saint-Mard, a village nearby Virton, Lesquoy began his career at the main club of the city, RE Virton, where he made his first-team debut on 28 February 2014 in the Belgian Second Division matchup against Eendracht Aalst which ended in a 3–0 loss. He was in the starting lineup but was sent off in the 55th minute. In the 2015–16 season, he was a regular starter for Virton. In that season, this club relegated from professional football, as the second tier in Belgium was reduced from seventeen to eight clubs. Because of this, Lesquoy played for three more years in the third-tier Belgian National Division 1, where Virton was able to win promotion in the 2018–19 season.

F91 Dudelange
After achieving promotion, Lesquoy moved to F91 Dudelange, the defending champions of the Luxembourg National Division. He made his European debut at the club, as he appeared in the UEFA Europa League against APOEL, Sevilla and Qarabağ.

Almere City
In 2020, Lesquoy signed a two-year contract with Dutch Eerste Divisie club Almere City FC as a free agent. He made his debut for the club on 30 August in a 0–0 home draw against MVV, starting at left back and playing the entire match. In the following match, a 6–4 shootout win over Excelsior, Lesquoy provided an assist to Thomas Verheydt for the opening goal. He suffered a foot injury in September, which sidelined him for a month. He made his return to the pitch in a 7–2 loss to fellow Eerste Divisie title contenders SC Cambuur on 15 November, coming on as a halftime substitute for Delvechio Blackson.

Ararat-Armenia
Lesquoy signed for Armenian Premier League club Ararat-Armenia on 28 January 2022 on a six-month contract.

Willem II
On 19 June 2022, Willem II announced the signing of Lesquoy to a two-contract. He made his competitive debut for the club on 19 August, starting at left-back in a 2–1 home win against Telstar.

Return to Virton
On 31 January 2023, Lesquoy returned to Virton.

References

External links 
 

1995 births
People from Virton
Footballers from Luxembourg (Belgium)
Living people
Belgian footballers
Association football fullbacks
R.E. Virton players
F91 Dudelange players
Almere City FC players
FC Ararat-Armenia players
Willem II (football club) players
Challenger Pro League players
Belgian National Division 1 players
Luxembourg National Division players
Eerste Divisie players
Armenian Premier League players
Belgian expatriate footballers
Expatriate footballers in Luxembourg
Belgian expatriate sportspeople in Luxembourg
Expatriate footballers in the Netherlands
Belgian expatriate sportspeople in the Netherlands
Expatriate footballers in Armenia
Belgian expatriate sportspeople in Armenia